Samberigi, or Sau, is an Engan language of the Southern Highlands province of Papua New Guinea.

References

Engan languages
Languages of Southern Highlands Province